Glitter is a 2001 American romantic musical drama film starring Mariah Carey and rapper Da Brat, written by Kate Lanier, and directed by Vondie Curtis Hall. Carey plays Billie Frank, an aspiring singer who, along with her friends Louise (Da Brat) and Roxanne (Tia Texada), is a club dancer. Timothy Walker (Terrence Howard) offers them a contract as backup singers/dancers to another singer. At the premiere of the song they record, Billie meets Julian "Dice" Black (Max Beesley), a nightclub DJ, who helps her in her solo career. In the process, Billie and Dice fall in love.

Carey began working on a film and soundtrack project titled All That Glitters in 1997. However, during that period, her label Columbia Records pressured her to release a compilation album in time for the holiday season in November 1998. Consequently, Carey put All That Glitters on hold. Following this, she aimed to complete the film and album project for the summer of 2001. Shooting began in Toronto and New York at the end of September 2000. Carey used the time to work on the soundtrack of the film, along with Eric Benét and Da Brat, who also appeared in the film.

The film was released on September 21, 2001, ten days after the release of the accompanying soundtrack on September 11, 2001. Before its release, Carey was suddenly hospitalized, citing "extreme exhaustion" and a "physical and emotional breakdown". During her hospitalization, Carey was diagnosed with bipolar disorder. Due to this, the film and soundtrack release were both postponed for three weeks.

Glitter was heavily lambasted by critics and was a box office bomb. Reviewers were highly disappointed with the film, and Carey's performance as an actress was considered by many to be amateur, earning her the worst actress award at the 22nd Golden Raspberry Awards. This also caused the film to receive negative commentary on social media sites, with Carey herself later admitting that she regretted being part of the film. Some went on to call it one of the worst films ever made. Glitter opened in 1,996 American theaters, and grossed $2.5 million in its first week, with a worldwide total of $5.3 million. The soundtrack of the film achieved moderate commercial success and went on to sell over two million copies worldwide, considerably less than Carey's previous releases.

Plot
In the 1970s, Lillian Frank is a performer at a nightclub. Lillian tries to rouse the crowd with her torch song, "Lillie's Blues", with her daughter Billie Frank accompanying her on vocals. The plot fails and Lillian is fired. Lillian feels defeated and lights a cigarette, but then accidentally falls asleep, starting a fire and causing the building to be evacuated. Due to her mother's actions, Billie is fostered.

Years later, in 1983, the adult Billie is a club dancer along with her foster-care friends Louise and Roxanne. They meet Timothy Walker, who offers a contract as backup singers and dancers to the singer Sylk and the three are contracted. Later at a nightclub hosted by Julian "Dice" Black, Sylk debuts "All My Life". Dice discovers that Billie is the real singer of the song, as a means to cover up Sylk's abysmal singing ability. Impressed, he wishes to produce her but Billie raises concerns about her contract with Timothy and he eventually agrees on the provision that Dice pays him $100,000.

Billie and Dice start working on songs. Ultimately they sign with Guy Richardson of a major record label. With success in their hands, he asks her up to his apartment and they have passionate sex. Billie's first major single, "Loverboy", is a success. Billie is called to perform at an awards ceremony, where she meets singer Rafael. Billie gets a threat from Timothy concerning the debt that Dice failed to pay. Billie, upset about how Dice lied about her contract and his arrest, argues with and leaves him. Following the break-up, Billie collaborates with several songwriters, including Rafael, with whom she makes another hit single, "Want You", and her debut album becomes a massive success.

Billie begins writing a song on her own, due to her emotional pain. Dice also misses Billie, and also begins writing a song. Billie goes to Dice's apartment to reconcile with him but discovers he is not home. She discovers the music he has written and realizes they wrote the same song, "Never Too Far", and kisses his music sheet. Dice, upon seeing her lipstick prints on the sheet, plans a reconciliation but is shot dead by Timothy. Before playing at Madison Square Garden, a devastated Billie sees the news report of Dice's death, and onstage after, commands the band to stop playing "Loverboy". She tearfully tells the audience not to take the ones they love for granted, and she then starts to sing "Never Too Far". Afterward, Billie reads a note Dice had left her, where he tells her that he loves her and that he has found Lillian. Billie's limo takes her to the secluded rural property where she is happily reunited with her mother.

Cast

Production
In late 1997, Carey began work on the project under the working title All That Glitters, but the project was put on hold due to Columbia Records' requests to release a compilation album to benefit from the 1998 holiday season. #1's was released in November 1998. Despite this, Carey continued working on All That Glitters, but wished to fulfil her contract with Columbia Records, which had her signed for one more album. In 1999, she released her last album with Columbia Records, Rainbow, which included some of the material created for All That Glitters. On April 2, 2001, Carey released a joint statement alongside Columbia Records confirming her departure.

Following this departure, Carey signed a US$100 million record deal with Virgin Records (EMI Records) in April 2001. The record label gave Carey full conceptual and creative control over the project. It was announced that All That Glitters would take place in 1983, with the sound of its soundtrack following the theme through a modernized version of the 1980s sound. Carey developed the film's concept to be about a club dancer who becomes a successful singer and wrote the screenplay alongside Kate Lanier, who expanded Carey's original concept. On her character, Carey stated,

We start the movie and we see little Billie and her mom singing, and we realize there's a dysfunction going on and her mom's unstable. She gets taken away from her mother and ends up in a foster home. Then, we meet her two friends, Louise and Roxanne, who are played by Da Brat and Tia Texada. They're her extended family. It's Billie's journey to understand why she feels abandoned by her mother. ... That's what drives her to want to sing. She connects with this [DJ] character. His name is Dice. He's sort of like what the mother is in terms of semi-dysfunctional.

Principal photography for All That Glitters began in New York City and Toronto in August 2000 and was expected to wrap up that late September with a planned release in March 2001. Later that month, Eric Benét was cast as a character named Caesar when the filming had already begun. The original screenplay, which was already finished, was rewritten several times on set during production and was oftentimes abandoned completely in favor of improvisation. Production experienced several delays and the release was pushed many times. In early April 2001, the film and soundtrack were still titled All That Glitters. By May of that year, All That Glitters was renamed to Glitter for the scheduled August 31, 2001, release.

Release and promotion

Following the commencement of Glitter and the release of the soundtrack's lead single "Loverboy", Carey embarked on a short promotional campaign for the song and its parent album. However, during the campaign, Carey exhibited what was reported as "erratic behavior." On July 17, 2001, Carey was interviewed on the program 106 & Park on the BET network. During the interview, Carey hid her thighs behind large pillows and ranted that her life was "one day that was continuous". Two days later, on July 19, Carey made a surprise appearance on the MTV program TRL. She came out onto the filming stage, pushing an ice cream cart while wearing an oversized shirt. Seemingly anxious and exhilarated, Carey began giving out individual bars of ice cream to fans and guests on the program, while waving to the crowd down below on Times Square, while diverging into a rambling monologue regarding therapy. Carey then walked to Daly's platform and began a striptease, in which she shed her shirt to reveal a tight yellow and green ensemble, leading him to exclaim "Mariah Carey has lost her mind!"

The next day, on July 20, Carey held a record signing for the soundtrack's lead single "Loverboy" at Roosevelt Field shopping mall in Long Island before fans and the media. As a camera crew covered the event, she began rambling on several subjects before finally discussing radio-host Howard Stern, and how his form of humor on his program bothered her greatly. At that point, Carey's publicist Cindi Berger grabbed the microphone from her hand, and asked the news crew to stop filming. Within a few days, Carey posted erratic voice messages on her website which were soon taken down. On July 26, she was hospitalized, citing "extreme exhaustion" and a "physical and emotional breakdown". Following her induction at an undisclosed hospital in Connecticut, Carey remained hospitalized and under doctor's care for two weeks, followed by an extended absence from the public.

Following Carey's publicized breakdown and hospitalization, Virgin Records and 20th Century Fox delayed the release of both Glitter and its soundtrack. The announcement was made on August 9, 2001, that both the soundtrack and the film would be postponed three weeks, respectively from August 21 to September 11, and from August 31 to September 21. When asked regarding the motives behind the delay, Nancy Berry, vice chairman of Virgin Music Group Worldwide, addressed Carey's personal and physical condition:

Mariah is looking forward to being able to participate in both her album and movie projects and we are hopeful that this new soundtrack release date will allow her to do so. She has been making great recovery progress, and continues to grow stronger every day. Virgin Music Worldwide continues to give its absolute commitment and support to Mariah on every level.

Carey's first promotional appearance to promote the film itself was on its opening day on Fox Theater, Westwood Village in jeans and a black tank top adorned with an American flag, paying homage to victims of the September 11 attacks. After giving interviews and signing autographs, Carey sat in the center section of the theatre flanked by security guards and handlers, along with audience members who had won tickets through the Los Angeles radio station Power 106. During her appearance, Carey said she hoped that Glitter would provide movie-goers an emotional escape during the attacks' aftermath in the country. "But obviously nothing can overshadow the events that have gone on, and I need to stay focused on that," she completed.

Fashions in the film were highlighted by costume designer Joseph G. Aulisi. Showcased were clothing by Soo Luen Tom, Luis Sequeira, Richard Saenz, Renee Fontana, and Michael Warbrock. On November 21, 2001, the film was released in the Philippines simultaneously with Harry Potter and the Philosopher's Stone. In Germany, the film was released under the title Glitter - Shine of a Star.

Home media
The film was released on VHS and DVD on January 15, 2002, by Columbia TriStar Home Entertainment. A Blu-ray version of the film was released on January 3, 2017, by Mill Creek Entertainment, under license from Sony and Fox.

Reception

Box office

Glitter was released in the United States on September 21, 2001. On its opening day, the film grossed an estimated $786,436 in 1,202 theaters. On the first weekend of its release, Glitter was the eleventh highest-grossing film, grossing an estimated $2,414,596. By the second week, the film dropped 61.1% on tickets sales, ranking at number 15 on the Box Office. It was originally scheduled to open over Labor Day weekend, but the film was pushed back three weeks when Carey was admitted to a hospital for what she stated was extreme exhaustion. Glitter was a commercial failure, grossing a total $4,274,407 in the United States. Worldwide, the film grossed a total of $5,271,666 until its close day, on October 18, 2001.

In an interview in 2010, Carey stated that she believed that the film's failure at the box office was largely due to the soundtrack's release date being September 11, 2001, the same day as the terrorist attacks on the World Trade Center and The Pentagon. She said, "Here's the thing that a lot of people don't know, that movie was released on September 11, 2001 – could there be a worse day for that movie to come out? ... I don't even know that many people even saw the movie."

Critical response
Glitter has a rating of 6% on Rotten Tomatoes based on 87 reviews with an average score of 2.9/10. The consensus states: "Glitter is a hodgepodge of movie cliches and bad acting that's sure to generate unintentional laughs. Unfortunately, the movie is not bad enough to be good." On Metacritic, the film has a score of 14 out of 100, based on 23 reviews, indicating "overwhelming dislike". Audiences polled by CinemaScore gave the film an average grade of "B-" on an A+ to F scale. Criticism focused on Carey's acting and the script's use of cliches.

The Village Voice proclaimed, "For her part, Carey seems most concerned about keeping her lips tightly sealed like a kid with braces, and when she tries for an emotion—any emotion—she looks as if she's lost her car keys." Peter Bradshaw joked that she "is comfortably out-acted by the cherrywood kitchen counter-top in her spiffy Manhattan apartment". Roger Ebert spoke relatively well of Carey's individual performance, writing that it "ranges from dutiful flirtatiousness to intense sincerity ..." However, he ended with, "and above all, the film is lacking in joy. It never seems like it's fun to be Billie Frank." Bruce Feld of Film Journal International also appreciated how the film heightened Carey's greatest talents: "Her beauty and extraordinary voice are always shown to advantage, and there are few pleasures in contemporary music as thrilling as hearing Carey soar to a high note and hang there like a trapeze artist who refuses to fall."

Lawrence Van Gelder of The New York Times said, "Glitter is mostly dross, an unintentionally hilarious compendium of time-tested cinematic clichés that illustrate the chasm between hopeful imitation and successful duplication." Total Film magazine reviewed the film extremely negatively, awarding it just one star and stating, "It can't even scale heights of campy awfulness. This isn't so bad it's good, it's so bad it's actionable ... An inept star vehicle that starts out desperately tedious and gets less interesting. Leaves you wishing the Lumiére brothers had said bollocks to cinema and gone down the pub." The film is listed in Golden Raspberry Award founder John Wilson's book The Official Razzie Movie Guide as one of the 100 Most Enjoyably Bad Movies Ever Made.

Retrospective reception
20 years after the release of the film, Mic writer Treye Green noted in an article that upon release, many people used the film to "defame and demean the pop music superstar" but he ultimately praised the theme of the film which is to "put yourself first and never abandon your dreams — a theme Carey lived out in real life as she boldly navigated harsh critiques and continued to push through". He went on to say,

The ebullience of Glitter was dimmed by a ravenous means to diminish the joy of the project and revel in the perceived leveling of Carey’s illustrious career. But after 20 years, the project is beginning to get the credit it deserves. The film is being elevated to a cult classic.

Green also called the film a "beloved symbol of the tenacity, resilience, and innovativeness Carey has shown throughout her legendary career". Medium writer Richard LeBeau also commented on the film saying that the film was not "deserving of its designation as one of the worst films ever made". He stated that "Lanier's screenplay is painfully cliched at times" and that the director, Curtis Hall, made "some cringe-worthy choices after a strong opening segment". He added that the "vitriol spewed at [Carey] during this period of time wreaked of misogyny, racism, and mental health stigma and completely overlooked the role of national tragedy, corporate sabotage, and her personal struggles".

Actors' response

Carey herself has also openly dismissed and distanced herself from the film; she stated in 2002 that "[the film] started out as a concept with substance, but it ended up being geared to 10-year-olds. It lost a lot of grit. It was gritless, in fact. I kind of got in over my head." In December 2013, during an appearance on Watch What Happens Live with Andy Cohen, Carey said she considered Glitter the biggest regret of her career, calling it a "kitsch moment in history ... in the history of my life". She stated that the film wreaked havoc on her career; "It was a horrible couple of years (after the film's release) and then I had to get my momentum back for people to let it go"; she further added that she would not let anyone around her mention the film in conversation and that it was known as "the G word." For two decades, Carey refused to perform any song from the film's soundtrack in her concerts. In 2020, Carey released her memoir, The Meaning of Mariah Carey, which highlighted her experiences throughout the release of the film. She called it "a collision of bad luck, bad timing, and sabotage".

Da Brat also claimed the film was a "major commercial failure and critical flop". In 2019, Brat filed for bankruptcy after having to owe a rapper, Shayla Stevens, $8 million. After "been subjected to physical threats, stalking and harassment", Brat denied earning any money from her social media and from her acting role in Glitter. She stated that "the last song she was credited for working on with Mariah was in 2001 and they have not released music since she got out of prison" and that she was "paid the SAG-AFTRA 'Scale' rate which is the basic minimum daily rate for a day's work for each day in the medium". In 2015, Brat stated in a Billboard interview, that she was proud of how she and Carey "made history on some of those songs. She’s sold millions of records, and I was very happy to be a part of [it]".

Max Beesley also commented on the film's reception stating that it "was a disaster". He went on to say in an interview with The Guardian, that in the film, there was originally "some heavy-duty drama [...] and Mariah really showed her acting boots" but "they just cut all that out and [he] nearly cried when [he] saw it". He went on to defend the film by saying, "It was released on September 12, the day after the atrocities, so it was dead". Tia Texada, who played Roxanne, also spoke on the film with Chaunce Hayden of Steppin Out in 2003, stating that the film "was a disaster from the time [she] got there". She went on to speak ill of Carey saying that "working with [her] was really hard". Conversely, Terrence Howards praised Carey and Beesley's performances, noting his "emotional experiences" with Beesley, calling him angelic and talented. He also added that the "experience and getting to know Mariah" was better than "the product".

Accolades

Soundtrack

The accompanying soundtrack, Glitter, became Carey's lowest showing on the charts. The first single, "Loverboy", peaked at number two on the US Billboard Hot 100 chart, but only after Virgin Records spurred sales of the single by dropping the price down to 99 cents. "Never Too Far", the album's second release, was released on October 23, 2001. It failed to impact the main Billboard chart, and achieved weak international charting. Carey was unable to film a music video for the single, as she was still recovering from her breakdown. Instead, a video was created using a scene taken directly from the film, where Billie Frank (played by Carey) sings the song at Madison Square Garden during her first sold-out concert. Frank's performance of the song in the film omits its entire second verse, and the song's development runs in parallel with the film's love story.

The album's third single, "Don't Stop (Funkin' 4 Jamaica)", released on December 10, 2001, mirrored the same weak charting as "Never Too Far", although receiving more rotation on MTV due to its video. Directed by Sanaa Hamri, it features the theme of southern bayous and lifestyles, and presents Carey and Mystikal in "southern style" clothing and hairstyles. Some shots feature three versions of Carey singing into a microphone on the screen at one time. The final single released from Glitter was "Reflections (Care Enough)", which received a limited release in Japan on December 15, 2001. Following its limited promotional push from Virgin, and the absence of a music video, the song failed to make much of an impact. The album itself struggled to reach gold certification, but since its 2001 release has been certified platinum. Virgin Records dropped Carey from the label due to the poor sales of the album and bought her out of their $100 million contract with her for $20 million.

2018 resurgence

In 2018, almost two decades after the release of the soundtrack for Glitter, a social media campaign called #JusticeForGlitter helped the soundtrack album soar to number-one of the iTunes charts in multiple countries. The soundtrack album also re-entered Billboard's Soundtracks chart at number 14 and topped the R&B/Hip-Hop Catalog Albums chart. Carey later added songs from the album in a medley as part of her Caution World Tour in 2019.

See also
 List of films considered the worst

References

External links
 
 
 
 
 

Mariah Carey
2001 films
2000s musical drama films
2001 romantic drama films
20th Century Fox films
American musical drama films
American romantic drama films
American romantic musical films
Columbia Pictures films
Films directed by Vondie Curtis-Hall
Films about music and musicians
Musical films based on actual events
Impact of the September 11 attacks on cinema
Films set in New York City
Films set in 1983
Films shot in Hamilton, Ontario
Films shot in New York City
Films shot in Toronto
Films produced by Laurence Mark
Films scored by Terence Blanchard
Golden Raspberry Award winning films
Films set in the 1970s
Films set in the 1980s
2000s English-language films
2000s American films